Hasan Pasha ( 1593–94) was the beylerbey of the Temeşvar Eyalet.  During the Uprising in Banat (1594), he gained aid from the Grand Vizier Koca Sinan Pasha and the Pasha of Budim, thus turned with an army numbering 20,000 soldiers and attacked Becskerek (Zrenjanin), in the hands of 4,300 rebels, ending in a decisive Ottoman victory. Subsequently, Sinan Pasha took an army of 30,000 soldiers which suppressed the badly armed Serbs.

References

Governors of the Ottoman Empire
16th-century Ottoman military personnel
Temeşvar Eyalet
16th-century births
Year of death unknown